Kikkeri Shamanna Lakshminarasimha Swamy (21 February 1939 – 20 October 2015), popularly known as K. S. L. Swamy / Lalitha Ravee / Ravee, was an Indian film director, producer, actor and playback singer. He entered cinema at an early age as an assistant to popular directors of the time such as G. V. Iyer and M. R. Vittal. He debuted as an independent film director with the 1966 film, Thoogudeepa. His other films such as Gandhinagara (1968) and Bhagya Jyothi (1975) and Malaya Marutha (1986) proved successful. His 1989 film Jamboo Savari won the National Film Award for Best Children's Film at the 37th National Film Awards.

Swamy was a close associate of director Puttanna Kanagal, and completed two of his films – Masanada Hoovu (1984) and the long delayed Saavira Mettilu that released in 2006, following the latter's death, which also turned out be his own last directorial venture. Recognizing his contribution to cinema, Swamy was awarded the Dr. B. Saroja Devi National Award in 2013. He was married to actress B. V. Radha.

Swamy was also an adept singer well known for the track "Suryangu Chandrangu" for the film Shubhamangala and "Ille Swarga Ille Naraka" for Nagarahole. Swamy died on 20 October 2015 due to breathing complications at Bangalore.

Filmography

As director 

 Thoogudeepa (1966)
 Lagna Pathrike (1967)
 Gandhinagara (1968)
 Bhagyada Bagilu (1968)
 Manku Dinne (1968)
 Anna Thamma (1968)
 Arishina Kumkuma (1970)
 Lakshmi Saraswathi (1970)
 Aaru Mooru Ombhatthu (1970)
 Bhale Adrushtavo Adrushta (1971)
 Sri Krishna Rukmini Satyabhama (1971)
 Kulla Agent 000 (1972)
 Devaru Kotta Thangi (1973)
 CID 72 (1973)
 Bhagya Jyothi (1975)
 Makkala Bhagya (1976)
 Thulasi (1976)
 Devara Duddu (1977)
 Maagiya Kanasu (1977)
 Mugdha Manava (1977)
 Banashankari (1977)
 Aluku (1977)
 Driver Hanumanthu (1980)
 Bhoomige Banda Bhagavantha (1981)
 Jimmy Gallu (1982)
 Matthe Vasantha (1983)
 Kranthiyogi Basavanna (1983)
 Mutthaide Bhagya (1983)
 Karune Illada Kanoonu (1983)
 Huli Hejje (1984)
 Pithamaha (1985)
 Malaya Marutha (1986)
 Mithileya Seetheyaru (1988)
 Jambu Savari (1989)
 Harakeya Kuri (1992)
 Maha Edabidangi (1999)
 Savira Mettilu (2006)... co-directed

References

Further reading

External links
 

1939 births
2015 deaths
Male actors from Bangalore
Kannada screenwriters
Kannada film directors
Kannada film producers
Indian male playback singers
Indian male film actors
20th-century Indian film directors
People from Mandya district
Film directors from Bangalore
Singers from Karnataka
Film producers from Bangalore
Producers who won the Best Children's Film National Film Award
Directors who won the Best Children's Film National Film Award
Recipients of the Rajyotsava Award 2004